KGPZ-LP (106.7 FM) is a radio station licensed to Grants Pass, Oregon, United States. The station is currently owned by SonSong Media.

KGPZ-LP is located at 269 W. Harbeck Road in Grants Pass, Oregon, USA, and can be heard at 106.7 FM in Grants Pass and the surrounding area, and online at kcgp.us.

References

External links
 

GPZ-LP
Grants Pass, Oregon
GPZ-LP
Radio stations established in 2008
2008 establishments in Oregon